Nelson County is a county located in the U.S. state of Kentucky. As of the 2020 census, the population was 48,065. Its county seat is Bardstown. Nelson County comprises the Bardstown, KY Micropolitan Statistical Area, which is also included in the Louisville/Jefferson County-Elizabethtown-Madison, KY-IN Combined Statistical Area.

History

The fourth county created in what is now Kentucky, it was formed from Jefferson County, Kentucky in 1784, shortly after the Revolutionary War. The county was named for Thomas Nelson Jr., the Virginia Governor who signed the Declaration of Independence. In 1807, after Kentucky had become a state, a newly created Virginia county was named in his honor.

Geography

Adjacent counties
 Spencer County  (north)
 Anderson County  (northeast)
 Washington County  (east)
 Marion County  (southeast)
 LaRue County  (south)
 Hardin County  (west)
 Bullitt County  (northwest)

Demographics

As of the census of 2010, 43,437 people inhabited the county. Its 18,075 housing units averaged . The racial makeup of the county was 93.48% White (90.93% non-Hispanic), 5.03% Black or African American, 0.12% Native American, 0.50% Asian, 0.02% Pacific Islander, 0.78% from other races, and 1.62% from two or more races. About 2.04% of the population was Hispanic or Latino of any race.

Of the 16,826 households, 36.60% had children under the age of 18 living with them, 52.09% were married couples living together, 13.19% had a female householder with no husband present, 5.35% had a male householder with no wife present, and 29.37% were not families. Of all households, 24.41% were made up of individuals, and 8.09% had someone living alone who was 65 years of age or older. The average household size was 2.55 and the average family size was 3.01.

The age distribution was 25.98% under 18, 7.98% from 18 to 24, 26.47% from 25 to 44, 27.84% from 45 to 64, and 11.73% who were 65 or older. The median age was 37.7 years. For every 100 females, there were 96.80 males. For every 100 females age 18 and over, there were 93.60 males.

Income data for Kentucky locations from the 2010 Census have not yet been released. Males had a median income of $32,015 versus $21,838 for females. The per capita income for the county was $18,120. About 10.00% of families and 12.20% of the population were below the poverty line, including 15.70% of those under age 18 and 17.40% of those age 65 or over.

Attractions and events
Many attractions and events are available in Bardstown. The following is outside the county seat:
 Rooster Run was a general store located on Kentucky Route 245 halfway between Bardstown and Clermont, well known for baseball caps featuring its logo and a  fiberglass rooster statue standing in front of the store. According to The Kentucky Encyclopedia, it is "one of the best-known general stores in the country and one of Kentucky's best-known unincorporated businesses".

Education
Two public school districts operate in the county:
 The Nelson County School District serves K–12 students throughout the county, with the exception of most of the city of Bardstown and developed areas near the city limits. The district operates two K–8 schools, two elementary schools, two middle schools, an alternative school, a vocational-technical school, and two high schools.
 The Bardstown City Schools serve students in most of the city of Bardstown, as well as much of the developed area immediately adjacent to the city limits. However, some areas of the city are instead served by the Nelson County district, and some of the Nelson County schools are physically within the Bardstown district. The district operates a preschool, an ungraded primary school (K–2), one elementary school, one middle school, and one high school. The  preschool and primary school occupy separate buildings on adjacent plots of land in the north of the city, and the other schools are adjacent to one another near downtown.

Several private schools also operate in the county. The Roman Catholic Archdiocese of Louisville operates five schools in all—three K–8 schools, a fourth that educates grades 1 through 8, and one high school. Several Protestant-affiliated schools also exist.

Politics

Notable residents

 William Beall; general in the Confederate Army
 J. C. W. Beckham; Governor of Kentucky
 Linda Bruckheimer; novelist and historic preservation activist
 Joseph Seamon Cotter Sr.; poet
 Henry Pierson Crowe; US Marine
 Ephraim H. Foster; Senator of Tennessee
 James B. Graham; Kentucky Auditor of Public Accounts
 Benjamin E. Grey; Congressman
 Joseph Hanks; great-grandfather of US President Abraham Lincoln
 Ben Johnson (politician); lawyer and congressman
 Silvester Johnson; merchant
 Monique Jones; professional bodybuilder
 Virgil Livers; football cornerback
 James Love (Kentucky politician); congressman
 Joseph N. McCormack; surgeon
 Thomas Merton; monk
 Zachariah Montgomery; lawyer and politician
 Charles S. Morehead; congressman and governor of Kentucky
 Felix Newton Pitt; monsignor
 Daniel Rudd; catholic journalist and civil rights leader
 Catherine Spalding; religious leader
 Horace Speed; pioneer and district attorney
 Stith Thompson; scholar of folklore
 Bryan Young (politician); congressman
 William Singleton Young; congressman

Communities

Cities
 Bardstown (county seat)
 Bloomfield
 Fairfield
 New Haven

Census-designated places
 Boston
 Chaplin
 New Hope

Other unincorporated places

 Balltown
 Cedar Creek
 Coxs Creek
 Culvertown
 Deatsville
 Highgrove
 Howardstown
 Icetown
 Lenore
 Nazareth
 Samuels
 Trappist
 Woodlawn

See also

 Louisville-Jefferson County, KY-IN Metropolitan Statistical Area
 National Register of Historic Places listings in Nelson County, Kentucky

References

Further reading

External links

 Government
 
 General information
 Bardstown-Nelson County Chamber of Commerce
 
 Nelson County Public Library

 
Kentucky counties
1784 establishments in Virginia
Louisville metropolitan area
Populated places established in 1784
Former counties of Virginia